A student is a learner, or someone who attends a school or takes classes.

Student may also refer to:
 Student (film), a 2012 Kazakhstan film by Darezhan Omirbayev
 Student (degree), an educational qualification in some countries
 At Christ Church, Oxford, a student is a senior member of the college (the equivalent of a fellow elsewhere) 
 STUDENT (computer program), an early artificial intelligence program
 William Sealy Gosset, pen name Student, statistician 
 Students, a 1953 novel by Yury Trifonov
 Student, a magazine published in 1968 by Richard Branson
 Student, the Malayalam-language newspaper of the Students' Federation of India

People with the surname
Kurt Student (1890–1978), German general

See also
Studentization, the process of adjusting a statistic for an estimate of its standard deviation
Studentized range
Studentized residual
Student's t-test, a statistical technique
Student's t-distribution, a probability distribution
The Student (disambiguation)